MoneySense is a Canadian online personal finance and lifestyle magazine published by Ratehub.

History and profile
MoneySense was founded by Rogers Media in 1999 and started publishing in September 1999. It covers articles on personal finance and targets both men and women.

In 2009 MoneySense launched a new website to distinguish its brand within Rogers Publishing and to address navigation challenges their customers were having with the old site. The site launch was sponsored by TD Canada Trust. Prior to this, MoneySense was merged with the Canadian Business and Profit under the CB Online brand banner.

In 2016 Rogers Media announced it was moving four publications, including Moneysense, Flare, Sportsnet and Canadian Business to a digital, online format. A significant cut back to its publishing division. The print edition was terminated in December 2016 and since January 2017, it has been published only online.

In 2018 it was reported that Rogers was looking to sell MoneySense along with Maclean's, Canadian Business, Today's Parent, Hello! Canada, Flare and Chatelaine in a single bundle. This was announced approximately two months after approximately 75 people were laid off.

Rogers sold the publication to Ratehub, a Toronto-based financial technology company, in 2018.

References

External links
 Official site

1999 establishments in Ontario
2016 disestablishments in Ontario
Business magazines published in Canada
Monthly magazines published in Canada
Online magazines published in Canada
Defunct magazines published in Canada
Magazines established in 1999
Magazines disestablished in 2016
Magazines published in Toronto
Online magazines with defunct print editions